Sirpur Kaghaznagar railway station is a major station on New Delhi–Chennai main line in Secunderabad division of South Central Railway in Indian Railways. It serves the Kagaznagar town in Komaram Bheem district in Telangana. The elevation of the railway station is 184 m above sea level.

References

Coordinates on Wikidata
Railway stations in Komaram Bheem district

Gallery